Facedown is an album by worship artist Matt Redman. The song "Nothing But the Blood" has been covered by Jamie Hill (of the band Quench) on his album One Day.

It was recorded during the Facedown: Conference for Songwriters which was held January 28–30, 2004, at North Point Community Church in Alpharetta, Georgia. One song, Facedown, was re-included on Redman's next album Blessed Be Your Name: The Songs of Matt Redman Vol. 1, however producer Nathan Nockels augmented that version with numerous overdubs.

Track listing
 Praise Awaits You
 Nothing But The Blood
 Seeing You
 Gifted Response (We Will Worship You)
 Dancing Generation
 Pure Light
 Worthy, you are Worthy (Duet with Chris Tomlin)
 Lead us up the Mountain
 Facedown 
 Breathing The Breath
 Mission's Flame
 Raise A Voice
 If I Have Not Love

2004 live albums
Matt Redman albums
Survivor Records live albums